Jahmile Addae (born May 30, 1984) is an American football coach and former safety who is currently the secondary coach for the University of Miami.

Playing career
Addae played college football at West Virginia, where he was a four-year starter, two-time captain, and two-time All-Big East defensive back.

Addae was chosen for the 2006 Senior Bowl and participated in the NFL Scouting Combine. He signed as an undrafted free agent with the Tampa Bay Buccaneers but ended up spending the end of the season with the Indianapolis Colts.

Coaching career

Graduate Assistant
In 2007 Addae got into coaching, working as a graduate assistant for the Mountaineers. In 2008 and 2009 he worked as a graduate assistant for Michigan.

Cincinnati
In 2010 he joined the Bearcats staff as Cincinnati's director of player development. In 2011 he was given an on the field position as the team's running backs coach which he held until the end of the 2012 season.

Arizona
Addae coached for five years at Arizona, first serving as an analyst from 2013 to 2015 then coaching the defensive backs in 2016 and 2017.

Minnesota
In 2018 he worked as the defensive backs coach for Minnesota.

West Virginia
In 2019 he returned to his alma mater to coach the secondary. He was given the title of cornerback's coach in 2020.

Georgia
In 2021, Addae was the defensive backs coach for Georgia. He was part of the staff that won the National Championship over Alabama.

Miami
In 2022 he left Georgia and joined the Miami Hurricanes as the team's secondary coach.

Personal life
Jahmile, and his wife, Maryann, have three sons.

His younger brother Jahleel Addae played safety in the NFL for the Colts.

References

1984 births
Living people
People from Valrico, Florida
Sportspeople from Hillsborough County, Florida
Players of American football from Florida
West Virginia Mountaineers football players
Coaches of American football from Florida
West Virginia Mountaineers football coaches
Michigan Wolverines football coaches
Cincinnati Bearcats football coaches
Arizona Wildcats football coaches
Minnesota Golden Gophers football coaches
Georgia Bulldogs football coaches
Miami Hurricanes football coaches